Chandigarh Junction railway station (station code:- CDG), serves the union territory city of Chandigarh. Chandigarh is amongst the top hundred booking stations of the Indian Railway.

History
The Delhi–Panipat–Ambala–Kalka line was opened in 1891, and the Chandigarh–Sahnewal line (also referred to as Ludhiana–Chandigarh rail link) was inaugurated in 2013.

Ambala–Chandigarh sector was electrified in 1998–99 and Chandigarh–Kalka in 1999–2000.

Amenities
Chandigarh railway station has computerized reservation facilities, General Railway Police outpost, telephone booths, tourist reception centre, waiting room, retiring room, vegetarian and non-vegetarian refreshment room, and book stall. In 2014, Chandigarh railway station got escalators.

The railway station is 8 km from the city centre. The airport is 7 km. City buses, auto rickshaws and cycle rickshaws are available at the station for local transportation.

References

External links

Railway stations in Chandigarh
Ambala railway division
Buildings and structures in Chandigarh
1891 establishments in India
Indian Railway A1 Category Stations